Below is a list of squads used in the 2020 UNAF Women's Tournament.

Algeria
Head coach:

Mauritania

Morocco

Tanzania

Tunisia

References

UNAF Women's Tournament